Thomas Southwell may refer to:

Thomas Southwell (priest) (fl. 1420s–1440s), Canon of Windsor
Thomas Southwell (died 1568), English landowner and courtier
Thomas Southwell (died 1643), English landowner
Thomas Southwell (Jesuit), pseudonym of Thomas Bacon (1592–1637), English-born Jesuit priest, teacher, and theologian
Sir Thomas Southwell, 1st Baronet (died 1680), Anglo-Irish politician
Thomas Southwell, 1st Baron Southwell (1665–1720), Irish MP for Limerick County 1695–1713 and 1715–1717, Commissioner of the Revenue
Thomas Southwell, 2nd Baron Southwell (1698–1766), his son, Irish MP for Limerick County 1717–1720
Thomas Southwell, 1st Viscount Southwell (1721–1788), his son, Irish MP for Enniscorthy and Limerick County 1761–1766
Thomas Southwell, 2nd Viscount Southwell (1742–1796), his son, Irish MP for Limerick County 1767–1780
Thomas Southwell, 3rd Viscount Southwell (1777–1860), his son, Irish peer
Thomas Southwell, 4th Viscount Southwell (1836–1878), his nephew, Irish Lord Lieutenant of Leitrim
Thomas Southwell (1813–1881), pioneer of the Australian Capital Territory, see Weetangera, Australian Capital Territory
Thomas Southwell (zoologist) (1879–1962), British zoologist